Taylors Island is an unincorporated community and census-designated place in Dorchester County, Maryland, United States, in the state's Eastern Shore region. The population was 173 at the 2010 census. It is known for hunting, crabbing and fishing. Ridgeton Farm was listed on the National Register of Historic Places in 1977. Bethlehem Methodist Episcopal Church and Grace Episcopal Church Complex were listed in 1979.

Geography
Taylors Island is in western Dorchester County on the eastern shore of Chesapeake Bay. It is separated from the mainland on the east by Slaughter Creek. Maryland Route 16 leads northeast from Taylors Island  to Cambridge, the Dorchester County seat.

According to the United States Census Bureau, the Taylors Island CDP occupies the central, northern, and western parts of the island.

Demographics

See also
Taylors Island Wildlife Management Area

References

External links
https://web.archive.org/web/20070702165414/http://www.dnr.state.md.us/publiclands/eastern/taylorsislandmap.html

 
Crabbing communities in Maryland
Fishing communities in Maryland
Census-designated places in Maryland
Census-designated places in Dorchester County, Maryland
Maryland populated places on the Chesapeake Bay
Maryland islands of the Chesapeake Bay